Joseph Patrick Lynch (November 16, 1872 – August 19, 1954) was an American prelate of the Roman Catholic Church. He served as bishop of the Diocese of Dallas from 1911 until his death in 1954.

Biography

Early life 
Joseph Lynch was born on November 16, 1872, in St. Joseph, Michigan, to John Valentine Lynch and Veronica Jane (née Botham) Lynch. John Lynch came to the United States from Newcastle, Moynalty, County Meath, Ireland, in 1866.  Veronica Lynch was born in Montreal, Quebec, Canada, and immigrated to the United States in 1856. 

In 1887, Joseph Lynch entered St. Francis Seminary in Milwaukee, Wisconsin. After graduating from St. Charles College in Ellicott City, Maryland, in 1891, Lynch studied theology at St. Mary's Seminary in Baltimore. Lynch then changed his study to law and then practiced for several years near Chicago, Illinois.

Lynch became acquainted with Bishop Edward Dunne, who convinced him to resume his seminary studies. Lynch then attended Kenrick Seminary in St. Louis, Missouri

Priesthood 
Lynch was ordained to the priesthood for the Diocese of Dallas on June 9, 1900. After his ordination, Lynch then served as a curate at Sacred Heart Cathedral Parish in Dallas, Texas. In 1902, he became pastor of St. Stephen's Parish in Weatherford. Texas. He erected churches in Weatherford and in Handley, Texas. The next year, Lynch was named the founding pastor of St. Edward's Parish at Dallas. He there established a church, rectory, and parochial school at St. Edward's In June 1910, Lynch was appointed vicar general of the diocese. Later that year, he became apostolic administrator of the diocese following the death of Bishop Dunne.

Bishop of Dallas 
On June 8, 1911, Lynch was appointed the third bishop of the Diocese of Dallas by Pope Pius X. He received his episcopal consecration on July 12, 1911, from Archbishop James Blenk, with Bishops Nicolaus Gallagher and John Morris serving as co-consecrators, at Sacred Heart Cathedral. At age 38 he was one of the youngest members of the American hierarchy.

Following the Mexican Revolution, Lynch became an advocate on behalf of Mexican refugees displaced to Dallas. He also erected a mission church for Mexican Americans in 1915. Known as the "Lion of Texas," Lynch was a widely regarded orator and delivered the main addresses at the bicentennial of San Antonio (1931), the centennial of the Battle of the Alamo (1936), and the installations of several bishops throughout the country. He was named an assistant at the pontifical throne on May 13, 1936.

During his tenure as bishop, Lynch ordained over 100 priests and established 150 churches, the majority of which were built in places that had never had a church at all. He built a segregated church for African American Catholics at Fort Worth in 1929. He also founded more than 200 religious and charitable institutions. During his episcopacy the Catholic population increased from 20,000 to 125,000, which necessitated the erection of the Dioceses of El Paso (1914), Amarillo (1926), and Austin (1953).

Death and legacy 
Joseph Lynch died on August 19, 1954, at age 81, and is buried at Calvary Hill Cemetery in Dallas.

References

1872 births
1954 deaths
Kenrick–Glennon Seminary alumni
St. Francis Seminary (Wisconsin) alumni
St. Charles College alumni
St. Mary's Seminary and University alumni
People from St. Joseph, Michigan
20th-century Roman Catholic bishops in the United States
American people of Irish descent
Catholics from Michigan